Richard Crawshay (1739 – 27 June 1810) was a London iron merchant and then South Wales ironmaster; he was one of ten known British millionaires in 1799.

Early life and marriage
Richard Crawshay was born in Normanton in the West Riding of Yorkshire. Initially starting work aged 16, working for Mr Bicklewith of York Yard, Thames Street, London (to whom he was apprenticed) in a bar iron warehouse in London, he became sole proprietor of the business on Bicklewith's retirement in 1763.

He married Mary Bourne in 1763 and they had a son William and three daughters, Anne, Elizabeth and Charlotte. Charlotte married Benjamin Hall, and became the mother of Benjamin Hall, 1st Baron Llanover.

Iron importation and ironworks proprietorship
By the 1770s he was a leading London iron merchant, dealing mainly in Swedish and Russian iron.  The firm was Crawshay and Moser in 1774, but Crawshay, Cornwell and Moser in 1784.  The business still existed as R & W Crawshay in 1816.  By 1775, he was acting as Anthony Bacon's agent for supplying iron cannon to the Board of Ordnance and was from 1777 a partner in that business (casting cannon at Cyfarthfa Ironworks at Merthyr Tydfil).  This continued until Bacon had to give up government contracts in 1782, because he was a member of Parliament.

In 1786, following the death of Anthony Bacon, he took over the whole Cyfarthfa Ironworks, in partnership with William Stevens (a London merchant) and James Cockshutt, who had previously managed the forge and boring mill for David Tanner.  In May 1787 he took out a licence from Henry Cort for his puddling process, but the rolling mill needed was not completed until 1789.  He solved the problems of the puddling process by using an iron plate for the furnace ceiling and sea-washed sand for the floor.  In 1791 he terminated the partnership, which had made little profit.  He continued the business alone, and had two blast furnaces, 8 puddling furnaces, 3 melting fineries, 3 balling furnaces, and a rolling mill in 1794.  A blast furnace was built by 1796, and a fourth in 1796.  There were 6 by 1810.   He thus developed Cyfarthfa into one of the most important ironworks in South Wales.

Crawshay was very ambitious and imperious in manner, being called 'The Tyrant' by some, but was without social pretension. He was active in protecting the interests of the iron trade and was a major promoter of the Glamorganshire Canal which immensely improved transport of iron to Cardiff Docks.

In 1799 he was the 6th wealthiest man or family in Britain (with some forerunners counted for completeness as wider family concerns), owning £2M. He was one of ten millionaires known that year. At his death in 1810 his undivested estate was sworn at £1.5 million. He was buried at Llandaff Cathedral.

See also
Cyfarthfa Castle – built by Richard's grandson, William.

References

External links
http://www.tlysau.org.uk/cgi-bin/anw/quicksearch?term=richard+crawshay
http://www.oxforddnb.com/view/article/45891

1739 births
1810 deaths
British ironmasters
English industrialists
People from Normanton, West Yorkshire
People from Merthyr Tydfil